Hire Association Europe (HAE) is a trade association formed in 1974. It has around 800 member companies. HAE lobbies the government on behalf of its membership. It is a non-profit organization limited by guarantee.

External links
 Hire Association Europe (HAE) Website
 Stronger Together - Official HAE blog
 Search Engine [USA] Website

European trade associations